Obrimus or Obrimos may refer to:
 Obrimus, possible name for Bromius (son of Aegyptus)
 Obrimos, a faction from the role-playing game Mage: The Awakening
 Obrimus (phasmid), a genus of phasmids in the family Heteropterygidae